Mosharekat-e Melli is a weekly magazine based in Kabul published by Hizbe Wahdat Islami (Islamic Unity Party). Between April 2012 and May 2013 Mohammad Reza Naseri served as the chief editor of the magazine.

References

Magazines published in Afghanistan
Hazaragi-language magazines
Mass media in Kabul
Magazines with year of establishment missing
Weekly magazines